George Clarke was an English professional association footballer who played as an outside right for Burnley.

References

Year of birth unknown
Year of death missing
English footballers
Association football outside forwards
English Football League players
Burnley F.C. players
Hyde United F.C. players